"Don't Let Me Down" is a song by Australian band, Eskimo Joe. It was released digitally in September 2009 as the third and final single from their fourth studio album Inshalla. The song peaked at number 50 on the ARIA charts.

Eskimo Joe performed the song on the first reunion show of the Hey Hey It's Saturday on 30 September 2009.

Music video
A music video directed by Damien Escott and Stephen Lance of Head Pictures was released.

Track listing

Charts

Release history

References

Eskimo Joe songs
2009 singles
Songs written by Kavyen Temperley
Songs written by Stuart MacLeod (musician)
Songs written by Joel Quartermain
Songs written by Steve Parkin (musician)
Song recordings produced by Gil Norton
2009 songs
Warner Music Group singles